The Waste Electrical and Electronic Equipment Directive (WEEE Directive) is a European Community Directive, numbered 2012/19/EU, concerned with waste electrical and electronic equipment (WEEE). Together with the RoHS Directive 2011/65/EU, it became European Law in February 2003. The RoHS Directive set restrictions upon European manufacturers as to the material content of new electronic equipment placed on the market.

The symbol adopted by the European Council to represent waste electrical and electronic equipment comprises a crossed-out wheelie bin with or without a single black line underneath the symbol. The black line indicates that goods have been placed on the market after 2005, when the Directive came into force. Goods without the black line were manufactured between 2002 and 2005. In such instances, these are treated as "historic WEEE" and fall outside reimbursement via producer compliance schemes.

The origins of the black line (or bar) stem from Directive 2012/19/EU  referencing European standard EN 50419. This standard gives two options for marking of equipment manufactured after 13th August 2005, namely 1) adding the date of manufacture to the label or 2) applying the line/bar underneath the bin logo.

Directive revisions

The directive has undergone a number of minor revisions since its inception in 2002 (Directive 2002/96/EC of the European Parliament and of the Council of 27 January 2003). These include updates in 2006 and 2009.

After nine years the Directive was seen as failing to achieve some of its goals, hence the legislation had been amended again. On 20 December 2011 the European Parliament and the European Council agreed on amendments to the Directive, subject to a second-reading vote, which was taken on 19 January 2012.

To provide a transitional period of seven years to introduce the revised method of calculation, the present method is retained for the first four years from the time the amended Directive comes into force. For the next three years, commencing with the fifth year after the amendment, the calculation of collection rates will be revised to 45% of the weight of E&E products entering the market. Once this seven years transitional period is over, EU member states will individually select the actual collection options they wish to use.

The overall aim was for the EU to recycle at least 85% of electrical and electronics waste equipment by 2016.

Member state implementation
The directive imposes the responsibility for the disposal of waste electrical and electronic equipment on the manufacturers or distributors of such equipment. It requires that those companies establish an infrastructure for collecting WEEE, in such a way that "Users of electrical and electronic equipment from private households should have the possibility of returning WEEE at least free of charge". The directive saw the formation of national "producer compliance schemes", into which manufacturers and distributors paid an annual fee for the collection and recycling of associated waste electronics from household waste recycling centres.

Deadlines
The WEEE Directive obliged the then 25 EU member states to transpose its provisions into national law by 13 August 2004. Only Cyprus met this deadline. On 13 August 2005, one year after the deadline, all member states except for the UK had transposed at least framework regulations. The WEEE Directive was transposed into UK law in 2006, and was active the following year.

Categorisations of WEEE
The directive places WEEE into numerous categories, the first tier being historic and non-historic. Historic WEEE implies equipment placed on the market prior to 2005 and the WEEE directive places the onus upon the owner of the equipment to make provisions for its recycling. Where equipment was placed on the market after 2005, it is known as non-historic WEEE (denoted by a bar underneath the crossed-out wheeled bin symbol), and it is the responsibility of the producer/distributor to make provisions for its collection and recycling.

The WEEE directive sets a total of 10 categories of WEEE for reporting purposes.

 Large household appliances
 Small household appliances
 IT and telecommunications equipment
 Consumer equipment
 Lighting equipment
 Electrical and electronic tools
 Toys, leisure and sports equipment
 Medical devices
 Monitoring and control instruments
 Automatic dispensers

UK implementation
Prior to the implementation of the WEEE directive in the UK, waste electronic and electrical equipment was disposed of in the household (municipal) waste stream. Post the introduction of the Hazardous Waste Regulations, exclusions apply to electrical and electronic equipment that are deemed hazardous. Hazardous wastes are derived (issued with a universal EU descriptor) from the European Waste Catalogue (known in the UK as the List of Wastes), which denotes wastes with a six digit number in three sets of two. Hazardous wastes are denoted with an asterisk at the end of the number. Hazardous electronic wastes comprise:

 Uninterruptable power supplies, lead-acid batteries
 Cathode ray tubes (televisions, computer monitors)
 Fluorescent tubes, backlights to laptop screens, thin-film transistors
 Electrical/electronic equipment containing polychlorinated biphenyl (PCB)
 Fridges and freezers, due to chlorofluorocarbon (CFC), an ozone-depleting substance. As of 2012 revisions to the regulations, all refrigerants are considered Hazardous.

WEEE that is delivered to household waste recycling centres (HWRC), also known as designated collection facilities (DCFs), is collected by or delivered to approved authorised treatment facilities (AATFs).  The waste electrical and electronic equipment is then weighed and categorised in accordance with the directive.

Post re-processing (recycling), total volumes of each category are reported to the producer compliance scheme and the reprocessor is reimbursed accordingly.  Totals of obligated WEEE for all AATFs are collated by the environment agency on a quarterly basis and reported to the EU.

Historically, there were problems with the implementation of the producer compliance schemes due to a "double counting" and reporting of reprocessed WEEE to producer compliance schemes.  This arose where obligated WEEE was partially treated by the first AATF to receive the waste, prior to it being passed onto a second AATF for further treatment.  Both the first and second AATF would then claim against the same waste electronics, resulting in a "net debt" against the wastes being treated.

Additional legislation that applies is:
 The Environmental Protection (Duty of Care) Regulations 1991
 Hazardous Waste Regulations (England & Wales) 2005
 Waste Framework Directive, or Directive 2008/98/EC

The management of WEEE is applied via the waste hierarchy, with particular emphasis upon reduction of waste arising, re-use of equipment and recycling (recovery) of materials: Reduce, Reuse, Recycle. In January 2012, proposals were debated by the European Parliament to recast the WEEE Directive. The proposals included increasing recycling rates.

Public awareness

In April 2005 the Royal Society of Arts in the UK (in conjunction with Canon) unveiled a 7 metre (23') tall sculpture titled WEEE Man on London's South Bank, made from 3.3 tonnes of electrical goods—the average amount of electrical waste one UK individual creates in a lifetime. It was designed by Paul Bonomini and fabricated by Stage One Creative Services. The giant figure was subsequently moved to the Eden Project in Cornwall as part of a UK tour.

See also
 China RoHS
 Computer recycling
 Cradle-to-cradle design
 Digger gold
 eDay
 Electronic waste
 Electronic waste by country
 Electronic Waste Recycling Act (disambiguation)
 Green computing
 RoHS
 RREUSE

References

External links
 European Commission WEEE page
RoHS directive
WEEE directive
www.weeelogic.com: WEEE compliance hub in Europe and beyond (WEEE, battery, packaging) www.weeelogic.com
 ecosurety – Expert WEEE compliance support and advice
EC4P – WEEE regulations in EU countries
 Waste electrical and electronic equipment (WEEE), The Environment Agency (UK government)
VCA- The UK Enforcement Body for WEEE Distributor Obligations
 More on WEEE from Electronics Weekly
WEEE Forum

Electronic waste in Europe
Waste legislation in the European Union
Waste legislation in the United Kingdom
European Union directives
2003 in the environment